Tow'rs is an American folk band based out of Flagstaff, Arizona. The band includes Gretta and Kyle Miller, drummer Dan Bagle, guitarist Kyle Keller, and cellist Emma Riebe. Kyle Miller's brother, Kory, also previously performed with the band as a drummer.

History 
Kyle and Gretta Miller met in 2008 while they were students at Northern Arizona University. They began writing music and performing at a local nondenominational Christian church. The couple married in 2012 and formed Tow'rs in 2014. Keller and Riebe were recruited through mutual friends from NAU.

In 2021 the band contributed a single, "Love Who You Love", to Serenade, an album they co-produced with other LGBTQ-affirming artists and Beloved Arise, an organization which aims to support religious LGBTQ youth. The single was inspired both by a drag show the Millers attended and a poem by Hafez about God being in drag.

Views 
The band's music initially used explicit references to Christianity in their lyrics, but they slowly moved away from explicit references in more recent works. Some of the band's members are agnostic or atheist. Gretta and Kyle have expressed discomfort with Christian nationalism, and have expressed support of LGBTQ rights.

Discography

Albums 

 Tow'rs (2014)
 The Great Minimum (2015)
 Grey Fidelity (2017)
 New Nostalgia (2019)
 The Holly and the Ivy (2020)

Awards 

 2015 Viola Awards, Emerging Artist
 2016 Viola Awards Nominee, Excellence in the Performing Arts for The Great Minimum
 2021 Viola Awards, Excellence in Music for The Holly and the Ivy
 2022 Viola Awards, Excellence in Collaboration for Serenade

External links 

 Official website

References 

Musical groups from Arizona
Musical groups established in 2014
American folk musical groups